David Cummins (born 27 December 1961) is an Irish former swimmer. He competed in three events at the 1980 Summer Olympics.

References

External links
 

1961 births
Living people
Irish male swimmers
Olympic swimmers of Ireland
Swimmers at the 1980 Summer Olympics
Place of birth missing (living people)
20th-century Irish people
21st-century Irish people